is a river located in Aomori Prefecture, in the Tōhoku region of northern Japan.

References 

Rivers of Aomori Prefecture
Rivers of Japan